Petia may refer to:

 Montréal–Pierre Elliott Trudeau International Airport (PETIA)
 Petia, a village in Buneşti Commune, Suceava County, Romania

People
 Petia (singer), singer, songwriter and actress
 Petia Arnaudova, Bulgarian physician and author

See also
 Petya (disambiguation)